Het Geheim van de Oude Molen  is a 1959 Dutch film directed by Henk van der Linden.

Cast
Jos van der Linden	... 	Joske
Nico Kwerreveld	... 	Nico
Tonny van Schendel	... 	De Dikke
Sjaak Franken	... 	Sjaakie
Thea Eyssen	... 	Tante Marie
Michel Odekerken	... 	Oom Joris
Frits van Wenkop	... 	Zigeuner
Miep Biessen	... 	Truus
Hub Consten	... 	Makelaar Bol
Victor Kicken	... 	Huurbaas
Jessy Schmeits	... 	Jessy
Jos Pyls	... 	Jos (as Jos Pijls)
Wim van der Weide	... 	Wim
Johnnie Custers	... 	Johnnie

External links 
 

1959 films
Dutch black-and-white films
1950s Dutch-language films